Iptacopan (LNP023) is a drug developed by Novartis designed to treat paroxysmal nocturnal hemoglobinuria (PNH), a disease in which the innate immune system destroys red blood cells. It is the first drug that selectively inhibits factor B, the active component of the complement's C3 and C5 convertases. In contrast to other PNH treatments like eculizumab, iptacopan is a small molecule.

In a clinical study with twelve participants, iptacopan as a single drug led to the normalization of hemolytic markers in most patients, and no serious adverse events occurred during the 12-week study. Iptacopan is also investigated as a drug in other complement-mediated diseases, like age-related macular degeneration and some types of glomerulopathies.

Sources 

Hematology
Indoles
Piperidines